(born 9 March 1962 in Kumamoto) is a retired long-distance runner from Japan, who represented his native country at the 1992 Summer Olympics. His personal best in the men's 10,000 metres was 28:18.15, achieved at the 1991 World Championships. Urata won four national titles during his career: in the 5000 metres (1988 and 1989) and in the 10,000 metres (1988 and 1989).

International competitions

References
 
 sports-reference

1962 births
Living people
Place of birth missing (living people)
Japanese male long-distance runners
Olympic male long-distance runners
Olympic athletes of Japan
Athletes (track and field) at the 1992 Summer Olympics
World Athletics Championships athletes for Japan
Japan Championships in Athletics winners
Japanese male cross country runners